The Laixi–Rongcheng high-speed railway is a high-speed rail line between Laixi and Rongcheng in Shandong Province, China.

History
The railway was approved on 31 August 2020. Construction on the railway officially began on 31 October 2020. It is expected to open in 2023.

Route

Stations
It will have the following stations:

References

High-speed railway lines in China
High-speed railway lines under construction